There is Nothing New Under the Sun is an EP by American metalcore band Coalesce which features the band covering songs by Led Zeppelin, which was originally released on May 18, 1999, through Hydra Head Records. In 2007, the recording was re-released by Hydra Head Records, which included the full original EP with re-recorded vocal tracks, a new master and all of the Coalesce tracks from their split EPs with The Get Up Kids, Today is the Day and Boy Sets Fire. The initial idea behind the covers album was to not only emulate Garage Days Re-Revisited, a Metallica album composed of covers, but to also allow for guitarist Jes Steineger to establish a musical connection with his father, as he was a fan of Led Zeppelin.

Track listing

Personnel

Band 
Sean Ingram – vocals
James Dewees – drums, vocals
Nathan Ellis – bass
Jes Steineger – guitar

Additional musicians 
Matt Pryor – vocals

Production 
Ed Rose – producer, engineer, mixing
Nick Zampiello – mastering
Dave Merullo – mastering

Design 
James O'Mara – photography, construction
Aaron Turner – art direction
David Lynch – photography

References

External links 
There Is Nothing New Under the Sun on Bandcamp

Coalesce (band) albums
Covers EPs
Albums produced by Ed Rose
1999 EPs
Hydra Head Records EPs
Led Zeppelin tribute albums